Jefferson "Jeff" S. Burton is an American politician and retired Army Major General. He is a member of the Utah House of Representatives serving the 66th district. Elected in 2020, he replaced Mike McKell who moved to a position in the Senate.

During the 2022 General Session, Burton served on the Executive Offices and Criminal Justice Appropriations Subcommittee, House Law Enforcement and Criminal Justice Committee, and the House Political Subdivisions Committee.

Personal life and education 
Burton was born  and raised in Payson, Utah, graduating from Payson High School.  He attended Brigham Young University, enrolling in their ROTC program before leaving school and joining the Army in 1984. He eventually graduated with a Bachelor of Science in Sociology at the State University of New York at Albany in 1986. Burton and his wife live in Spanish Fork, Utah.

Career
Burton served in the United States Army from 1984 to 2019, including the last seven years as Adjutant General of the Utah National Guard.  Following his retirement he was appointed by Utah Governor Herbert to lead day-to-day operation of the Utah Department of health's COVID-19 response, on the unified command staff. Burton works as the Senior Vice President of Community Development at Zions Bank. He was elected to the Utah House of Representatives in 2020 and assumed office on January 1, 2021.

Election
After Mike Mckell announced he would not seek reelection in the House of Representatives, but instead seek the seat in the Utah State Senate, Burton announced his intention to run for the 66th seat. In the Repuclican primary he beat Kari Malkovich, a Woodland Hills City council member, carrying 60% of the vote. He ran uncontested in the 2020 general election.
Burton faced public criticism after he violated DOD rules by using images of him in uniform on multiple iterations of his campaign flyers.

2022 sponsored legislation

References 

Living people
People from Payson, Utah
People from Spanish Fork, Utah
Republican Party members of the Utah House of Representatives
21st-century American politicians
United States Army personnel of the Gulf War
United States Army personnel of the Iraq War
United States Army personnel of the War in Afghanistan (2001–2021)
Adjutants general of the United States Army
Brigham Young University alumni
University at Albany, SUNY alumni
Date of birth missing (living people)
Year of birth missing (living people)